Ayumi Tanaka (born 1986) is a Japanese pianist and composer, known for numerous albums with Norwegian and international jazz musicians.

Education 
Tanaka moved to Norway in 2011, and got her education at the Norwegian Academy of Music in Oslo, where she finished her Master's degree as a performing jazz musician, after studies with Misha Alperin, Ivar Antonsen, Helge Lien and others.

Career 
Tanaka is acclaimed for her own trio with the bass player Christian Meaas Svendsen and the drummer Per Oddvar Johansen. The group released their debut album Memento in January 2016. With the trio Tanaka/Lindvall/Wallumrød, with Johan Lindvall and Christian Wallumrød, she released the album 3 Pianos i 2016. She has also recorded with Nakama, Mongrel, and with Thomas Strønen's acclaimed Time is A blind Guide on ECM.

Discography

As band leader 

Ayumi Tanaka Trio with Christian Meaas Svendsen and Per Oddvar Johansen
2016: Memento (AMP Music & Records)

Tanaka/Lindvall/Wallumrød with Johan Lindvall and Christian Wallumrød
2016: 3 pianos (Nakama Records)

Collaborations 
With Thomas Strønen's Time is A blind Guide
2018: Lucus (ECM)

With Nakama
2015: Before The Storm (Nakama Records)
2016:Grand line (Nakama Records)
2016:Most Intimate (Nakama Records)
2017:Worst Generation (Nakama Records)

With Mongrel
2016: Thick As Thieves (Losen Records)

References

External links 
Official website
Ayumi Tanaka Trio on Facebook

1986 births
Living people
Japanese women composers
Japanese jazz composers
Japanese jazz pianists
Japanese women pianists
Norwegian Academy of Music alumni
21st-century Japanese women musicians
21st-century pianists
Nakama (band) members
21st-century women pianists